Oliver Williams may refer to:
 Oliver Williams (cricketer)
 Oliver Williams (American football)